An indirect legislative election was held in South Korea on 16 February 1976 to elect 73 members of the National Assembly who have been appointed by President Park Chung-hee.

Electoral system 
One-third of all the members of the National Assembly are elected by the National Conference for Unification. The National Assembly members elected by the National Conference for Unification are recommended by the President. In order to be elected, the slate of members appointed by the President needs to receive the approval of a majority of the delegates of the National Conference for Unification present in the election. The election is valid if a majority of all the delegates of the National Conference for Unification are present.

National Assembly members elected by the National Conference for Unification have a term of three years.

Candidates 
On 14 February 1976, President Park Chung-hee submitted a list of 73 members he had appointed to the National Assembly and five reserve members. Among the 73 members he had appointed, 50 were members who Park had appointed in 1973 and 20 were new appointees.

Election 
The National Conference for Unification met on 16 February 1976 to elect the National Assembly members appointed by President Park Chung-hee.

At the time of the election, 2,303 out of the original 2,359 delegates were eligible to vote following the death or resignation of 56 delegates. Out of the 2,303 eligible delegates, 2,289 were present in the election.

Result

By city/province

References

Legislative elections in South Korea
1976 elections in South Korea